The White Rabbit is a 1952 non-fiction book by Scottish writer Bruce Marshall.  Its title comes from a nickname of F. F. E. Yeo-Thomas.

Synopsis
F. F. E. Yeo-Thomas was the British Special Operations Executive (SOE) agent, called by the Germans "The White Rabbit" of World War II. He was given responsibilities by the British government in occupied Vichy France because he had lived in France during the interwar years and was fluent in French.

An assignment required Yeo-Thomas to be parachuted into France. Shortly after his arrival he was betrayed and captured by the Gestapo at the Passy metro station in Paris.

The Gestapo took him to their headquarters in the Avenue Foch, and he was subjected to brutal torture, including beatings, electrical shocks to the genitals, psychological gameplaying, sleep deprivation, and repeated submersion in ice-cold water—to the point that artificial respiration was sometimes required.

After the interrogations and torture, he was moved to Fresnes prison.  After he made two failed attempts to escape he was transferred first to Compiègne prison and then to Buchenwald concentration camp. Within these various detention camps he attempted to organise resistance.

Late in the war, he briefly escaped from Buchenwald and, on his recapture, was able to pass himself off as a French national and sent to Marienburg, Stalag XX-B, a "better" camp, where the Nazis sent enlisted Frenchmen, instead of back to Buchenwald. It is reasonable to conclude that his chances of surviving the remainder of the war at Buchenwald were low.

After the war he resumed his life in France.

Notable people mentioned in the book

 Phil Lamason
 Christopher Burney
 Harry Peulevé
 Stéphane Hessel
 Alfred Balachowsky
 Hermann Pister
 Karl-Otto Koch
 Ilse Koch
 Pierre Brossolette
 Eugen Kogon
 Erwin Ding-Schuler
 Jean Moulin
 Arthur Steele

References

1952 non-fiction books
British biographies
Books by Bruce Marshall
Biographies adapted into films